Estradiol benzoate butyrate/algestone acetophenide, also known as estradiol benzoate butyrate/dihydroxyprogesterone acetophenide (EBB/DHPA) and sold under the brand names Neolutin N, Redimen, Soluna, and Unijab, is a form of combined injectable birth control which is used in Peru and Singapore. It contains estradiol benzoate butyrate (EBB), an estrogen, and algestone acetophenide (dihydroxyprogesterone acetophenide; DHPA), a progestin. The medication is given once per month by injection into muscle.

Medical uses
EBB/DHPA is used as a once-a-month combined injectable contraceptive to prevent pregnancy in women.

Available forms
EBB/DHPA contains 10 mg estradiol benzoate butyrate (EBB), an estrogen, and 150 mg algestone acetophenide (dihydroxyprogesterone acetophenide; DHPA), a progestin.

Pharmacology

Pharmacodynamics
EBB/DHPA has been said to have relatively weak estrogenic activity and has been described as "progestogen-dominant".

Pharmacokinetics
EBB is said to have a shorter duration than estradiol enantate of about 3 weeks. EBB/DHPA was developed because it was thought that the duration of EBB would be more suitable for use as a once-monthly combined injectable contraceptive than estradiol enantate in estradiol enantate/algestone acetophenide.

Society and culture

Brand names
EBB/DHPA is marketed under the brand names Neolutin N, Redimen, Soluna, and Unijab. It was originally developed under the tentative brand name Unimens, but ultimately was not marketed under this particular brand name.

Availability
EBB/DHPA is available only in Peru and Singapore.

See also
 Combined injectable birth control § Available forms
 Estradiol enantate/algestone acetophenide
 List of combined sex-hormonal preparations

References

Combined injectable contraceptives